Nyemo may refer to:

Nyêmo County, county in Tibet
Nyêmo Town, town in central Tibet